= Delia Vallejos =

Peruvian singer and musician

Delia Vallejos (1925–2005) was a Peruvian singer, Peruvian Creole musician and member of the group "The Big Six Peruvian song" (Las Seis Grandes de la Canción Peruana)
